Coprosma lanceolaris  is a flowering plant in the family Rubiaceae. The specific epithet comes from the Latin lancea (“lance” or “spear”) with the suffix -aris (“pertaining to”), alluding to the shape of the leaves.

Description
It is a shrub growing to 2 m in height. The fleshy, bright green, broadly lanceolate or lanceolate to elliptic leaves are 30–90 mm long, 15–40 mm wide, with a foetid odour when crushed. The flowers are small and green, 5 mm long. The egg-shaped red fruits are 6–8 mm long. The flowering season is from mid May to mid October.

Distribution and habitat
The species is endemic to Australia’s subtropical Lord Howe Island in the Tasman Sea. It is common in the montane forest of the island, at elevations of over 500 m.

References

lanceolaris
Endemic flora of Lord Howe Island
Plants described in 1875
Gentianales of Australia
Taxa named by Ferdinand von Mueller